Samcheok is a city in Gangwon-do, South Korea.

History

Ancient age & Three Kingdom
 It was called "Siljikguk or Siljikgokguk" 
 102 under the rule of Silla (Pasa 23rd)
 468 under the rule of Goguryeo (Jangsu 56th)
 505 The name changed to Sil-jick joo (Jijeung 6th)
 658 The name changed to Book-jin (Muyeol 5th)

Unified Silla
 757 The name changed to Samcheok-gun (Gyeongdeok 16th)

Goryeo Dynasty
 995 The name changed to Cheokjoo (Seongjong 14th)
 1018 The name changed to Samcheok-hyun (Hyeonjong 9th)

Joseon Dynasty
 1393 Samcheok-hyun was raised into Samcheok-bu (Taejo 2nd)
 1413 change of the name to Samcheok protectorate (Taejong 13th)
 1895 change of the name to Samcheok-gun (Gojong 32nd)

Japanese occupation
 1917 Bunae-myeon change of the name to Samcheok-myeon
 1938 Samcheok-myeon was raised into Samcheok-eup

Republic of Korea
 1973 Jangsung-eup Hwangji branch office was raised to Hwangji-eup (at that time, the most population of the county)
 1980. 04. 01. Bukpyeong-eup was Incorporated into Donghae-si
 1980. 12. 01. Wondeock-myeon was elevated to Wondeock-eup
 1981. 07. 01. The combination of Jangseong-eup and Hwangji-eup was raised into Taebaek-si
 1986. 01. 01. Samcheok-eup was raised into Samcheok-si 
 1986. 03. 27. Wondeok-eup Ojeo branch office was raised into Kagok-myeon
 1989. 01. 01. Yonghwa-ri and jangho-ri were incorporated into Gundeok-myeon
 1994. 12. 26. 5 districts (Called ri) of Hajang-myeon were incorporated into Taebaek-si
 1995. 01. 01. The combination of Samcheok-si and Samcheok-gun was incorporated to Samcheok-si

Education
Samcheok has one university, KNU Samcheok Campus, established March 1, 2006. (formerly Samcheok National University)

Climate

Sister cities

Domestic

  Seongbuk-gu, Seoul since October 14, 1999
  Yeonsu-gu, Incheon since October 13, 2000
  Guri, Gyeonggi-do since March 20, 2001
  Icheon, Gyeonggi-do since August 17, 2004
  Seongnam, Gyeonggi-do since June 22, 2007
  Ulleung County, Gyeongsangbuk-do since June 25, 2009

International
  Akabira, Hokkaidō, Japan since July 18, 1997
  Kanda, Fukuoka, Japan since July, 1997
  Wangqing County, Jilin, China since September 4, 1997
  Kurobe, Toyama, Japan since November 5, 1998
  Dongying, Shandong, China since March 24, 1999
  Kungur, Perm Krai, Russia since May 30, 2003
  Mareeba Shire, Queensland, Australia since November 9, 2004
  Jixi, Heilongjiang, China since May 21, 2008
  Korsakov, Sakhalin Oblast, Russia since August 30, 2010

Notable people
Kim Yeon-sik - current Taebaek mayor, Gangwon Province (elected GNP) 
Park Sang-cheol - trot singer 
Hwang Young-cho - marathon runner (winner of the marathon race at the 1992 Summer Olympics and 1994 Asian Games)
Lee Jaehyeong - member of K-pop band The Rose

Tourist Attractions
Samcheok Railbike
Hwanseong and Daegeum Caves
Haesindang Park - Also known as the Penis Park. This park can be reached in 40 minutes by riding the 24, or 24-1 local bus.
Samcheok Rose Park
Samcheok, Jeungsan, Yonghwa, Maengbang and Jangho Beaches.

Festival 

Samcheok Maengbang Canola Flower Festival

The Maengbang Flower Festival boasts a view of canola flowers, cherry blossoms and the blue sea of the East Coast.

The festival also offers a diverse set of events and programs including a local produce market, fresh strawberry picking, and exhibition on canola flowers and bees.

See also
List of cities in South Korea

References

External links
Samcheok city government home page

 
Cities in Gangwon Province, South Korea
Port cities and towns in South Korea